The Museum of the Southwest is a multidisciplinary cultural museum opened in 1966. It displays a selection of prints, paintings, and drawings. It also houses the Durham Children's Museum. The museum is situated in a  mansion built in 1937 and is listed on the National Register of Historic Places.

Fred and Juliette Turner House
The house was designed by architect Anton F. Korn and was built during 1936-37.

Exhibitions 

 Out of Many, One: Portraits of America's Immigrants, January 2022
 Away from the Earth: The Fort Worth Circle of Artists, February 2022

References

National Register of Historic Places in Harrison County, Texas
Buildings and structures completed in 1850